The CSS General Earl Van Dorn, a side-wheel river steamer, was fitted out in early 1862 at New Orleans, Louisiana as a River Defense Fleet "cottonclad" ram. It was named for Confederate general Earl Van Dorn, born and raised in Mississippi.

In late March, the ship steamed up the Mississippi River to Memphis, Tennessee, where outfitting was completed. In the naval action off Fort Pillow on May 10, the Van Dorn attacked a Union mortar boat with gunfire and rammed the ironclad .

On June 1, the steamer was used to help cover the Confederate evacuation of Fort Pillow. It retreated to Memphis, where, on June 6 it was the only survivor of the River Defense Fleet's final battle. After escaping to Yazoo City, Mississippi, General Earl Van Dorn was burned by its Confederate crew on June 26, 1862, to avoid capture by Federal warships.

See also
Bibliography of early American naval history
Seth Ledyard Phelps (Battle of Memphis section)

References 

Cottonclad rams of the Confederate States Navy
Shipwrecks of the American Civil War
Ship fires
Shipwrecks in rivers
Maritime incidents in June 1862